Religion Inc. The Church of Scientology is a non-fiction book about Scientology and L. Ron Hubbard, written by Stewart Lamont.  The book was published in hardcover edition by Harrap, in 1986.

Cited by other works
Religion Inc. is cited by other books and research reports on the subject matter, including:  Journal of the American Academy of Religion, The State of the Discipline, Canadian Journal of Sociology, Marburg Journal of Religion, Shaking the World for Jesus, The Social Dimensions of Sectarianism, Alternative Religions:  A Sociological Introduction, La Secte, and The Alms Trade.

Synopsis
The work includes twenty-seven photographs, taken by the author in the course of research for the book.

Lamont describes the difficulty authors often encounter in writing and publishing critical books on the Church of Scientology:  "Books about Scientology have a greater permanency than newspaper articles and therefore it should not come as a surprise that vigorous smear-campaigns have been conducted against the authors of such investigations."  Lamont later goes on to chronicle some of the harassment suffered by author Paulette Cooper after the publication of The Scandal of Scientology, including recounting parts of Operation Freakout.  Lamont also goes into the inherent motivation for profit within the organization.

The book also details L. Ron Hubbard's actions later in life:  his retreat to sea, isolated lifestyle in California, and death.

References

External links
Full text online
Full text, hosted by Dr. David Touretzky

Books critical of Scientology
Books about Scientology
1986 non-fiction books
1986 in religion